The North Staffordshire Railway (NSR) New L Class was a class of 0-6-2T steam locomotives designed by John H. Adams, third son of William Adams. They were designed as a development as the previous L Class, adding a boiler common to the M Class and differed from the L Class with, amongst other things higher bunker sides and new cab roofs, and the abandonment of the cast safety valve cover. 28 were built between 1908 and 1923, with the final four constructed under the auspices of the newly formed LMS with the whole class withdrawn by the end of 1937. There is one survivor.

The class were built at the NSR's Stoke works in four batches with a number of differences in weight, grate area and heating surfaces. Those built in 1913 had saturated Belpaire boilers identical to those on the H1 Class of 0-6-0s. The final batch had slightly fewer boiler tubes and did not have condensers nor lagging on the side tanks. in 1921 numbers 18 and 93 were experimentally converted to oil burning.

Although built primarily as a goods tank engine, it proved its worth on passenger trains as well and became an ideal mixed traffic tank locomotive. After grouping they travelled much further than any other NSR class, and thus became one of the most well known from the NSR.

All entered the London, Midland and Scottish Railway (LMS) stock upon formation in 1923, although with the LMS policy of standardisation, many NSR classes were prime targets for early scrapping due to the small size of the classes. As a result, all were withdrawn by the end of 1937. One was sold to the Longmoor Military Railway whilst five more were sold to Manchester Collieries Ltd. The rest were scrapped. 

The livery of the 'New L' Class was NSR Madder Lake with straw lining, and NORTH STAFFORD lettering on the side tanks along with the company crest. the number appeared on the bunker. In LMS service, some  members of the class merely had the North Staffordshire lettering removed and the first few through the works received their new LMS number in NSR style. However, soon enough they received the standard plain black freight livery with large numerals on the side tanks. Those sold to Manchester Collieries carried their standard livery of plain black with red lining.

NSR No 2 was one of the five "New L" locos sold to Manchester Collieries in Walkden by the LMS in October 1937 under its LMS identity of 2271. The loco was named "Princess" in 1938, and was eventually rebuilt with a new saturated boiler plus new tanks, bunker and cylinders in 1946. In 1960 the locomotive was repainted as NSR No 2 for the "North Staffordshire Railway Centenary" exhibition in Stoke-on-Trent. Following the engine's appearance at this rail event it kept its identity as NSR No 2 upon its return to industrial service at Walkden.

In 1964 the boiler, tanks and cab from "Princess" were fitted onto the chassis of another former NSR New L engine - NSR No. 72 (LMS No. 2262) built in 1920  - subsequently named "Sir Robert" at Walkden). The NSR No 2 identity was maintained, however, and upon the end of service at Walkden the engine was saved by Staffordshire County Council and placed on display at their Shugborough Hall museum. 

In 1984 it was moved to Chatterley Whitfield mining museum, for storage out of public view, before being donated to the National collection as the final surviving NSR steam locomotive. With the mining museum closing in 1993, No 2 was placed on display at the Churnet Valley Railway's Cheddleton museum where investigation work was made to restore the locomotive to service. A shortage of funds and lack of technical ability at the time saw the locomotive eventually leave Cheddleton, and it was to eventually find its way onto display at NRM Shildon. In April 2016, it was delisted from the National Collection, and donated to the Foxfield Railway near Stoke on Trent for display and eventual overhaul which is where it currently resides.

There has been a high level of debate over No 2's true identity, as traditionally locomotives took their numbers from their frames which would make the surviving loco NSR no. 72. As 'New L' class all had superheated boilers, the fact the engine survives with a saturated boiler takes the discussion much further as to whether it can even be classed as a NSR locomotive.

The original chassis of No 2 received a new boiler plus the bunker and tanks from NSR No 69 (named "King George VI") at Walkden in 1965, before this locomotive itself was scrapped in 1969 despite attempts to preserve it.

List of locomotives

References

North Staffordshire Railway
0-6-2T locomotives
Railway locomotives introduced in 1908
Standard gauge steam locomotives of Great Britain
Scrapped locomotives